is a novel by Ryū Murakami, first published in Japanese in 2005 and translated into English in 2013 by Ralph McCarthy, Charles De Wolf, and Ginny Tapley. The novel depicts an alternate history in which North Korea invades and then occupies Japan in 2011.

Awards 
From the Fatherland With Love was awarded the 59th Mainichi Publishing Culture Award and the 58th Noma Literary Prize in 2005.

References 

2005 Japanese novels
Japanese historical novels
Japanese alternate history novels
Political novels
Novels by Ryū Murakami
Novels set in the 2010s
Fiction set in 2011